Tezeta Sürekli (born 8 April 1980) is a Turkish long-distance runner. She competed in the women's 5000 metres at the 2004 Summer Olympics.

References

1980 births
Living people
Athletes (track and field) at the 2004 Summer Olympics
Turkish female long-distance runners
Olympic athletes of Turkey
Place of birth missing (living people)